Robert Watiyakeni (died April 27, 1993) was a Zambian footballer and member of the national team.  He was among those killed in the crash of the team plane in Gabon in 1993.

Career
Watiyakeni played professional club football in South Africa for Dynamos F.C.

Watiyakeni made several appearances for the Zambia national football team and participated in the 1992 African Cup of Nations finals.

References

1993 deaths
Zambian footballers
Zambian expatriate footballers
Zambia international footballers
1992 African Cup of Nations players
Victims of aviation accidents or incidents in Gabon
Expatriate soccer players in South Africa
Year of birth missing

Association footballers not categorized by position
Dynamos F.C. (South Africa) players
Footballers killed in the 1993 Zambia national football team plane crash